Salgado Filho Porto Alegre International Airport  is the airport serving Porto Alegre and the region of Greater Porto Alegre, Brazil. It is named after the Senator and first Minister of the Brazilian Air Force Joaquim Pedro Salgado Filho (1888–1950).

It is operated by Fraport Brasil.

History
Salgado Filho was originally called São João Federal Airport, after the neighborhood where it is located. In the beginning it was an air club, where the first flights landed on May 31, 1923.

In 1932, needing a facility to use its aircraft with landing-gear which were replacing its seaplanes, Varig started using São João Airport as its operational base. However, it was only in 1940 that the first passenger terminal was commissioned.

On October 12, 1951, São João Federal Airport was renamed Salgado Filho Airport, after the Senator and Minister who died the year before on a crash involving a SAVAG aircraft that departed from Porto Alegre.

In 1953, the old terminal was incorporated into the maintenance facilities of Varig, a new passenger terminal was opened, and runways were paved. Until that year larger aircraft such as Lockheed L-049 Constellations had to land at Canoas Air Force Base. This new terminal is known today as Passenger Terminal 2. It underwent major renovations and enlargements between 1969 and 1971 but unable to cope with the increasing traffic, another brand new facility was built. This new facility was named Passenger Terminal 1 and opened on September 11, 2001. Terminal 2 became underused by general aviation and cargo services.

However, in order to cope with the increasing passenger traffic at the airport, on September 8, 2010 a decision was made to renovate Terminal 2 and bring it back into passenger use. It became operational on December 4, 2010. This terminal 2 was again closed for air traffic on September 15, 2019 and it became the administration center of Fraport Brasil S.A.- Aeroporto de Porto Alegre.  

Previously operated by Infraero, in January 2018, the airport's operations and administration were taken over by the German private airport operator Fraport, which in the previous year had been the winning bidder in an B3 (stock exchange) auction conducted by the Brazilian government for the concession of the airport for 25 years. Since the airport concession, Fraport has been expanding the runway from the current 2,280 meters (7,481 ft) to 3,200 meters (10,499 ft), allowing the landing of large aircraft and allowing the landing of flights from North America and Europe. It is expected that the expansion works will be concluded at the end of 2021.

Terminal 1 has  and 16 gates with jetways. Terminal 2 has . In front of Terminal 1 there is a carpark with 1,440 places. Terminal 1 is the first facility in Latin America with a shopping mall.

One of the two TAP Maintenance & Engineering centers in Brazil is located at Salgado Filho International Airport.

As of May 2022, the airport's expanded 3,200 m (10,499 ft) runway began to come into operation. With the runway expansion, larger aircraft such as the Boeing 747-400, Boeing 777-300 and Airbus 330-900 can operate at the airport, allowing direct flights to Europe and the United States.

Airlines and destinations

Passenger

Cargo

Statistics

Ground transport

Since August 10, 2013, the Metro-Airport Connection people mover connects the International Airport to the Porto Alegre Metro Airport Station. From this metro station one can reach most cities of the metropolitan area of Porto Alegre. Bus routes T5, T11, and B09 link Terminal 1 - International Airport to the city of Porto Alegre.

Accidents and incidents
February 28, 1942: a Varig Junkers Ju 52/3m registration PP-VAL crashed shortly after take-off from Porto Alegre. Seven of the 23 occupants died, including 2 crew members.
June 20, 1944: a Varig Lockheed 10 A/E Electra registration PP-VAQ on approach to Porto Alegre after a flight from Pelotas during a storm crashed on the waters of Guaíba river. All 10 passengers and crew died.
August 2, 1949: a Varig Curtiss C-46AD-10-CU Commando registration PP-VBI operating a flight from São Paulo-Congonhas Airport to Porto Alegre made an emergency landing on rough terrain near the location of Jaquirana, approximately 20 minutes before landing in Porto Alegre, following fire on the cargo hold. Of the 36 passenger and crew aboard, 5 died.
June 30, 1950: a SAVAG Lockheed Model 18 Lodestar registration PP-SAA, flying from Porto Alegre to São Borja in bad weather collided against a hill, caught fire and crashed near the location of São Francisco de Assis. All 10 occupants died, including the founder of SAVAG and pilot, Gustavo Kraemer, and Joaquim Pedro Salgado Filho, senator and first Minister of Air Force in Brazil.
October 14, 1952: an Aerovias Brasil Douglas C-47-DL registration PP-AXJ operated by Real Transportes Aéreos en route from São Paulo-Congonhas to Porto Alegre struck high ground while flying under adverse conditions over the location of São Francisco de Paula. Of the 18 passengers and crew aboard, 14 died.
October 18, 1957: a Varig Douglas C-47A-80-DL registration PP-VCS operating a cargo flight from Porto Alegre crashed upon take-off. The crew of two died.
May 30, 1972: a Varig Lockheed L-188 Electra registration PP-VJL operating a flight between São Paulo-Congonhas to Porto Alegre was hijacked. The hijacker demanded money. The aircraft was stormed and the hijacker shot.

Gallery

See also
List of airports in Brazil

References

External links

Airports in Rio Grande do Sul
Airports established in 1923
Porto Alegre
1923 establishments in Brazil